Westland Books or Westland Publications is an Indian publishing house. It was co-founded by the Padmanabhan family in 1962, starting out under the name East West Books. Tata owned it from 2008 as a subsidiary under Trent (Westside). It was owned by Amazon under Amazon Eurasia Holdings SARL from 2017 till 2022. Imprints included Context, Eka, Red Panda, Tranquebar.

In February 2022, Amazon announced that it will be shutting down Westland Books, after having carried out a "thorough review". In April 2022, it was announced that the Westland team was going into partnership with Indian online digital platform Pratilipi to continue publishing books.<ref>

References

Further reading 
 
 
 
 
 
 
 
 

Defunct book publishing companies
Publishing companies established in 1962
Book publishing companies of India
Amazon (company) acquisitions